The Fiction Monthly ( Xiaoshuo Yuebao; Original English title: The Short Story Magazine) was a Chinese literary journal published by the Commercial Press in Shanghai. First published in July 1910, its original editors were Yun Tieqiao (恽铁樵) and Wang Chunnong (王莼农). In January 1921, Mao Dun (Shen Yanbing) became its chief editor beginning with Volume 10, Issue 1. Fiction Monthly closed its doors in 1932 after the Japanese invasion of Shanghai with their naval and air bombardment (January 28 Incident). Altogether there were 22 volumes or 262 issues, including four specials.

Publication history
The Fiction Monthly originally published poems and stories in the classical wenyan style, and plays in the new style. Western fiction and plays were also translated into wenyan. It was the domain of "Mandarin Duck and Butterfly School"(鸳鸯蝴蝶派) literature, published entertaining and recreational articles. The selections included popular love stories and situational novels. Many traditional serial novels were published in the journal. It was an important platform for the traditional scholars.

But they were going against the new literature tide and Mao Dun(茅盾) changed the editorial direction in 1921. He enticed contributors from the "new literature" circles. The January 10 issue proclaimed its "new editorial direction": to translate and critique important European works; develop literature of realism, and use the new literature to reflect the life of ordinary people, also to provide a platform for inquiry into classical literature in the modern context.

Zheng Zhenduo(郑振铎) became the main editor since the volume 14, issue 1 in 1923. Due to the 412 Event, Zheng went to Europe and Ye Shengtao(叶圣陶) became the main editor instead of Zheng. Zheng came back to be the main editor again since volume 20, issue7 in June 1929.

Background   

There is competition of western and traditional literatures in the late 1920s and early 1930s. The competition between Butterfly writers and May Fourth writers was represented like new versus old or westernized versus traditionalized. "Mandarin Duck and Butterfly School" was one of the most popular popular books in the literary field before the New Culture Movement, which make Fiction Monthly very popular among readers. Chinese ducks鸳鸯 and butterflies蝴蝶 are in pairs, which are the symbols of lovers. However, it was critiqued by May Fourth writers because it represents of old feudal thoughts and rules.

Because Chinese literature need revolution, "Mandarin Duck and Butterfly School" became the opposite of new culture. Old national forms were broke to conform to the new forms of the world trend during the May fourth Movement.

Zhou Zuoren strongly promoted humanist literature, struggled for human freedom, attacked all traditional literatures including the Journey to the West because they were fulfilled with traditional moral rules such as Confucian morality.   Soon after Shen Yanbing joined the Shanghai Communist Party group, the authorities of the Commercial press decided to adapt to the new trend of the May 4th movement and completely reform the Fiction Monthly. It was the second literary journal to be published by Commercial Press.

The Shape of Journal

It is visually similar to general journals, comprised 80 to 100 pages, shorter than Xin Xiaoshuo 新小说 and longer than Xiuxiang Xiaoshuo 绣像小说. It was printed much more closely than other journals, split to upper and lower halves in a regular format, fifteen lines of twenty-one characters on each of it. There are many more characters on one page which make the magazine very small thus it can be easily carried around and read at anywhere.

Notable contributors

Yun Tieqiao: Yun is second editor after Wang Chunnong. Fiction Monthly transform to a serious and elegant literature magazine, it became one of the most outstanding magazines in China when he was the editor. Its sales amount was more than ten thousand every month, it also sold overseas to Japan, British, etc. It was an ideal pltform for development of new literature.

Mao Dun: Mao Dun studied how to marry the new and old literatures together. When the new reformed version of Fiction Monthly was published, the issue is an adaptation of literary evolution. Mao Dun not only hired popular writers like Lu Xun, Zhuo Zuoren, but also gave chances to new writers like Hu Yepin, Dai Wangshu.  Actually the selling amount of Fiction Monthly was not satisfying in the first year after the revolution of Mao Dun, it became hard to read for some readers. The revolution is not easy, revolution was always criticized by old writers at that time. Mao Dun wrote article to stand for new literatures. He worked on Fiction Monthly for 2 years.

Zheng Zhenduo: Zheng Zhenduo took charge of the literature research association, thus he has a higher reputation among editors. Mao Dun received help from Zheng during the time he worked on Fiction Monthly, many important manuscripts of the journal are organized and approved by Zheng Zhenduo. Although Zheng became the main editor from volume 14, he was involved in working on Fiction Monthly from two years ago.

Zheng added new contents to Fiction Monthly, such as old literature verses new literatures, history of Chinese and Foreign literature, literature principles, make it popular and favourable until 1932, the sales amount became much better than 1921.

Creative works

Fiction Monthly published novels in abundance, followed by poetry, plays and essays. They included "Duanwu Festival", "Upstairs in a Restaurant", "Social Drama" and other novels by Lu Xun 鲁迅. In the early years, there were short stories by Ye Shengtao (Ye Shaojun), Bing Xin, Wang Tongzhao 王统照, Xu Dishan, and others; new literature style poems by Zhu Ziqing, Xu Yunuo 徐玉诺, Zhu Xiang 朱湘, Liang Zongdai, Xu Zhi 徐雉, and others. These works show the bitterness of life and expose the dark side of society, sympathetic to the repressed people.

After 1923 other famous writers' works include Wang Tongzhao's "Dusk"《黄昏》, Zhang Wentian's "Travels"《旅途》, Lao She's novel Old Zhang's Philosophy《老张的哲学》, and poetry such as Zhu Ziqing's "Destruction" 《毁灭》, Ye Shaojun's "Liuhe battlefield"《浏河战场》 and Zhu Xiang's "Wang Jiao"《王娇》.

In 1927 there were more early works by authors who became famous, Mao Dun's novels Disillusion 《幻灭》, Wavering《动摇》, and Pursuit《追求》; Ding Ling's first novel Dream《梦珂 and her early work Miss Sophia's Diary 《索菲亚的日记》, Ba Jin's Destruction 《灭亡》; plus works by new writers Hu Yepin, Shen Congwen, Dai Wangshu, Shi Zhecun, Sun Xizhen 孙席珍、Zhang Tianyi, and others. All of these writings gave a rich picture of life in China during the early 20th century from a panoramic perspective and a variety of viewpoints. The sense of realism was very strong.

Translations
The Fiction Monthly published some 800 articles about literature from 39 countries including over 300 authors. Translations by Geng Jizhi 耿济之 in 1921 include Russian realism such as:
 Diary of a Madman by Gogol;
 Anna Karenina by Chekhov;
 Fathers and Sons and Notes of a Hunter by Turgenev.
Lu Xun translated Artsybashev and wrote an essay on him; and there was a Volume 12 special edition on Russian Literature. There were numerous other articles, which taken together comprise a systematic exploration of Russian realism and romanticism.

The 15th volume was a French Literature special. It introduced French romanticism, naturalism and realism in literature and plays, including Balzac, Maupassant, Phillipe, Anatole France, George Sand, and others.

Reviews, critiques and theory
Fiction Monthly provided a forum for critical reviews as a means to form the philosophical and technical foundations for the new vernacular literature. Fortunately Lu Xun was not only a gifted writer but also an eloquent critic and reviewer. Both he and his brother Zhou Zuoren authored many reviews and essays about writing in the journal. Shen Yanshui, the editor, himself wrote a number of important theoretical essays on the new literature, including "Responsibility and Hard Work for the New Literature" 《新文学研究者的责任与努力》、"The future of Creativity" 《创作的前途》、"Social Background and Creativity" 《社会背景与创作》、"Naturalism and Contemporary Chinese Fiction" 《自然主义与中国现代小说》 and more.

The journal from time to time provided special columns for discussion of theoretical issues. Spirited disagreements flourished in these columns as well as in the reviews and essays. The antagonists would respond in alternative issues. These proved to be irresistible to writers and scholars of the time. Some important examples were:

"Discussions on Translating Literature" “翻译文学书的讨论”, "Discussions on Europeanization of Literature"、“语体文欧化讨论”、 "Discussions about Creative Works" “创作讨论”，and "Naturalism" “自然主义”、and "Nature of Literature and its Problems" “文学主义问题”。From 1910 to the mid-1930s, the entire written and printed Chinese language was transformed. Fiction Monthly provided a focus on these changes participating fully in the transition by its creative authors and in establishing the framework for the transition from critical and theoretical points of view.

Classical literature
Beginning in 1923, Fiction Monthly provided a special column called "Movement to organize ancient literature and new literature".  Additionally there were numerous treatises about classical literature as well as a two-issue Special about "Research into Chinese Literature" 中国文学研究, consisting of 60 articles by 35 authors. The topics included pre-Qin, Wei, Jin and Six Dynasties literature, Tang and Song Dynasty poetry, Yuan Dynasty dramas, Ming and Qing Dynasty novels, and folk literature.

Fiction Monthly published classical novels and poems for the first ten years before 1921. It then changed editorial policy to promote the new literature. It had a unique perspective from which to view classical Chinese literature and wenyan. In its entirety, these articles form an important comprehensive collection of research into old traditional Chinese literature even today.

Features
From the beginning, Fiction Monthly presented a certain freshness to the reader. The articles were chosen quickly, accurately (to match the reader's taste), and with multiple dimensions. There were entertaining novels and short stories for a general readership, as well as literary reviews for scholars. The editors had an unerring instinct for what its readers liked. The longer novels were serialized. Even though it did not chase fashionable trends the readers kept on coming back eager for the next issue.

References

 Encyclopedia.com article on Mao-Tun
 Yahoo Encyclopedia article on Mao-Tun

1910 establishments in China
1932 disestablishments in China
Literary magazines published in China
Defunct magazines published in China
Defunct literary magazines
Magazines established in 1910
Magazines disestablished in 1932
Magazines published in Shanghai
Monthly magazines published in China
Chinese-language magazines